An ice pop is a liquid-based frozen snack on a stick. Unlike ice cream or sorbet, which are whipped while freezing to prevent ice crystal formation, an ice pop is "quiescently" frozen—frozen while at rest—and becomes a solid block of ice. The stick is used as a handle to hold it. Without a stick, the frozen product would be a freezie.

An ice pop is also referred to as a popsicle in Canada and the United States, flash in Algeria, paleta in Mexico, the Southwestern United States and parts of Latin America, ice lolly in the United Kingdom (the term ice pop refers to a freezie in the United Kingdom),  ice drop in the Philippines, ice gola in India, ice candy in India and Japan, ai tim tang or ice cream tang in Thailand (though both words is also colloquially used to refer to ice cream bar), and kisko in the Caribbean. The term icy pole is often used in Australia, but is a brand name for a specific type, so ice block is also used.

History
As far back as 1872, two men, doing business as Ross and Robbins, sold a frozen-fruit confection on a stick, which they called the Hokey-Pokey.

Francis William "Frank" Epperson (August 11, 1894, Willows, California – October 22, 1983, Fremont, California) of San Francisco, California, popularized ice pops after patenting the concept of "frozen ice on a stick" in 1923.

Epperson claimed to have first created an ice pop in 1905, at the age of 11, when he accidentally left a glass of powdered lemonade soda and water with a mixing stick in it on his porch during a cold night, a story still printed on the back of Popsicle treat boxes.

Epperson lived in Oakland and worked as a lemonade salesman.

In 1922, Epperson, a realtor with Realty Syndicate Company in Oakland, introduced the Popsicle at a fireman's ball. The product got traction quickly; in 1923, at the age of 29, Epperson received a patent for his "Epsicle" ice pop, and by 1924, had patented all handled, frozen confections or ice lollipops. He officially debuted the Epsicle in seven fruit flavors at Neptune Beach amusement park, marketed as a "frozen lollipop," or a "drink on a stick."

A couple of years later, Epperson sold the rights to the invention and the Popsicle brand to the Joe Lowe Company in New York City.

Terminology
In the United States and Canada frozen ice on a stick is generically referred to as a popsicle due to the early popularity of the Popsicle brand, and the word has become a genericized trademark to mean any ice pop, regardless of brand or format. The word is a portmanteau of pop and icicle; the word is genericized to such an extent that there are decades-old derived slang meanings such as "popsicle stand". The term ice pop is also used in the United States.

In Ireland the term ice pop is predominantly used. In the United Kingdom the term ice lolly is used to refer to ice pop while the term ice pop refers to a freezie (flavoured ice inside a tube). The term chihiro is used as a slang term in the Cayman Islands, partially derived from chill. Different parts of Australia use either ice block or icy pole (which is a brand name), and New Zealand uses ice block. In the Philippines the term ice drop is used with coconut flavor ice pops being called ice bukos. India uses the terms ice gola and ice candy. In Japan the term ice candy is used.

Paleta
After a trip to the United States in the early 1940s Ignacio Alcázar returned to his home city of Tocumbo, Michoacán, México, bringing the idea to manufacture ice pops or paletas (little sticks) using locally available fresh fruit. He and some family members expanded by opening a shop in Mexico City which became very popular and he began to franchise Paletería La Michoacana to friends and family from his town. The popularity of paletas and association with Tocumbo has increased to the status of a national Mexican food.

Paleta flavors can be divided into two basic categories: milk-based or water-based. The composition of each flavor may vary, but the base is most often fruit. Paleterias usually have dozens of flavors of paleta including local flavors like horchata, tamarind, mamey and nanche along with other flavors like strawberry, lime, chocolate and mango. Distinctly Mexican ingredients like chili pepper, chamoy, and vanilla are often present in these paletas. Paleterias adapt their flavors to the tastes of the community and local availability of ingredients.

Paletero

A paletero (roughly equivalent to the English "ice cream man"), is a street seller of paletas and other frozen treats, usually from a pushcart labeled with the name of the enterprise that made the paletas (paletería). Today, many paleteros are now commonly found in American cities with significant Mexican populations. Vending requirements for paleteros vary widely by city.

Homemade ice pops

An alternative to the store-bought ice pops is making them at home using fruit juice, drinks, or any freezable beverage. A classic method involves using ice cube trays and toothpicks, although various ice pop freezer molds are also available.

In the UK, there is an increasing number of people making alcoholic ice lollies at home by putting alcoholic drinks inside the mould. Buckfast, Kopparberg and Strongbow Dark Fruit ciders are popular choices used.

Innovations in ice pop creation
In 2018, the UK food-focused design firm called Bompas & Parr announced that they had created the world's first 'non-melting' ice pop. The ice pop does melt but not as fast as other ice pops. This is due to the strands of fruit fibers inside the ice pops which makes them thicker than regular ice pops. The thicker the ice pop the slower it melts. This design was inspired by the material called pykrete, which was invented by Geoffrey Pyke.

World record ice pop
On June 22, 2005, Snapple tried to beat the existing Guinness World Records entry of a 1997 Dutch  ice pop by attempting to erect a  ice pop in New York City. The  of frozen juice that had been brought from Edison, New Jersey, in a freezer truck melted faster than expected, dashing hopes of a new record. Spectators fled to higher ground as firefighters hosed away the melted juice.

See also
 Creamsicle
 Freezie—a.k.a. ice pole, similar to an ice pop, but without the stick
 Ice cream
 Ice cream bar—similar to an ice pop, but made with ice cream
 Lollipops
 Sorbet

References

Further reading
 laverrán, Virginia González. "Historia del Helado en México By Martin González de la Vara". Historia Mexicana 40 .2 (1990): 350-354.
 Ortiz, Laura Velasco. "La Michoacana. Historia de Paleteros de Tocombu by Martin González de la Vara". Historia Mexicana 58.1 (2008): 509-516.
 
 Zuñiga, Ricardo Miranda (October 2004). "Vagamundo: A migrant's Tale".

External links

 How do people refer to the frozen treat pictured here? —The University of Manchester

California culture
Cuisine of the Western United States
Food and drink in the San Francisco Bay Area
Ice-based desserts
Skewered foods
Snack foods